Beqir Kosova (born 20 May 1949) is an Albanian shooter who competed at the 1972 Summer Olympic Games in the 50 metre rifle prone, he finished 66th.

References

1949 births
Living people
Albanian male sport shooters
Shooters at the 1972 Summer Olympics
Olympic shooters of Albania
Place of birth missing (living people)